Sviland is a borough in the southwestern part of the municipality of Sandnes in Rogaland county, Norway. It is located in the rural  part of the municipality, southeast of the city of Sandnes. With a population (2020) of only 1,332, the borough is one of the least populous of all the boroughs in Sandnes. Sviland Chapel is located in the borough.

The borough is home of the legendary Norwegian race horse Rex Rodney, winner of the 1986 Elitloppet.

References

Boroughs and neighbourhoods of Sandnes